"You" is a song by British pop group S Club 7, released on 11 February 2002 as the final single from their third studio album, Sunshine (2001). The track served as the theme song to their third series, Hollywood 7, in 2001, and was the group's last single to feature band member Paul Cattermole. The song reached  2 on the UK Singles Chart, ranking at No. 70 on the year-end edition.

The song's music video is set in the 1950s and is described in the Best CD booklet as a "candy floss-bright, tongue-in-cheek 50s pastiche". In a 2019 interview, Cattermole stated that the song was not the group's choice as a single, as they felt it was a step backwards from the more mature and contemporary sound they had established with the rest of the album but were overruled by management.

Music video

The first part of the video stars Rachel Stevens as a wife who cooks food for her husband portrayed by Paul Cattermole as he arrives home. But a mistress played by Jo O'Meara appears out of nowhere, distracts Cattermole and they start dancing. Then they enter another room through a curtain, revealing the other band members. The part ends with Hannah Spearritt dancing. The second part shows Stevens mowing the lawn. Jon Lee joins her, but soon goes to O'Meara, who is having a barbecue. The smoke from the grill shows the other six members dancing under umbrellas. Stevens looks while using a hose, which turns off then sprays her in the face. The third part takes place in the garage. Bradley McIntosh is repairing the car. Stevens looks at him, McIntosh does likewise. Then O'Meara appears in the car dancing with McIntosh. The others come in. Stevens is sad until the others sing to her. They all sing together and they drive off.

The music video for "You" was filmed after "Don't Stop Movin'" and was intended as the follow up single before the group were asked to record the Children in Need single ("Have You Ever") for that year.

Track listings

 UK CD1 and Australian CD single
 "You" (single version) – 3:31
 "The Long and Winding Road" – 3:44
 "Bring the House Down" (Almighty mix) – 7:21
 "You" (CD-ROM video) – 3:31

 UK CD2
 "You" (single version) – 3:31
 "Stronger" (Solar8 mix) – 5:48
 "You" (The Bold and the Beautiful Swishy Disco mix) – 6:09

 UK cassette single
 "You" (single version) – 3:31
 "You" (karaoke version) – 3:31

 European CD single
 "You" (single version) – 3:31
 "You" (The Bold and the Beautiful Swishy Disco mix) – 6:09

Credits and personnel
Credits are lifted from the Sunshine album booklet.

Studios
 Produced at Steelworks Studios (Sheffield, England)
 Mastered at Transfermation (London, England)

Personnel

 Eliot Kennedy – writing, keyboards
 Tim Lever – writing, guitars
 Mike Percy – writing, keyboards
 Tim Woodcock – writing, guitars
 Henrik Linnemann – flute
 Nik Coombs – flugelhorn
 Matthew Burke – trumpet
 Owen Bourne – trombone
 Steelworks – production
 Stephen Lipson – additional production
 Heff Moraes – mixing
 Ben Coombs – engineering
 David O'Hagan – assistant engineering
 Richard Dowling – mastering

Charts

Weekly charts

Year-end charts

Release history

References

S Club 7 songs
19 Recordings singles
2001 songs
2002 singles
Music television series theme songs
Music videos directed by Julien Temple
Polydor Records singles
Songs written by Eliot Kennedy
Songs written by Mike Percy (musician)
Songs written by Tim Lever
Songs written by Tim Woodcock